Galerie Smend is a gallery in Cologne, Germany showing textile art. The gallery was founded in 1973 and run by Rudolf G. Smend until today.

History 
The Gallery is specialized in textile art and shows international textile artists. After Rudolf Smend went on a journey through Middle East, Afghanistan, Pakistan, India and Malaysia to Indonesia in 1972, he opened one year later a batik-gallery in Cologne. During his journey he attended courses by batik-artists. He also visited little craft enterprises and studied the diverse techniques and collected valuable fabrics of all kinds. With many of those fabrics and artworks he returned to Germany. In 1973, the same year of his opening, he showed on the first international Art Fair IKM, (later the Art Cologne), in Düsseldorf, his batik textiles.

Exhibitions 
The great breakthrough brought the large exhibition "Batiken von Fürstenhöfen und Sultanspalästen aus Java und Sumatra" in 2000, which took place in the Rautenstrauch-Joest-Museum and was composed by the gallery.  Altogether the gallery showed more than 250 exhibitions and published 15 books and comprehensive catalogues.

1973: 1. International Art Fair IKM, today Art Cologne
1974: Art 5, Art Basel
1974: 2. Internationaler Kunstmarkt Köln
1996: 7. Korean textile-art Biennale
2000: Rautenstrauch-Joest-Museum Köln, Batik-sammlung von Smend „Batiken von Fürstenhöfen und Sultanspalästen aus Java und Sumatra"
2005: American Textile History Museum, Lowell USA
2005: 1. Textile ART, Berlin
2008: Several exhibition
  Arts of Pacific Asia Show in San Francisco
 Textile and Tribal Arts Show in San Francisco
 Textile and Tribal Arts Show in New York
 Textile ART Berlin (MB)
 Exhibition: Monika Speyer, Peter Algier, Kobayashi Shoukoh
 Batik-exhibition : Fritz Donart, Jonathan Evans, Beth Mc Coy, Rosi Robinson
 Exhibition: Irina Kolesnikova
 Exhibition: Arimatsu Shibori - Murase
2009: Arts of Pacific Asia Show, San Francisco
2009: Textile and Tribal Arts Show, San Francisco
2010: Arts of Pacific Asia Show in San Francisco
2010: Textile and Tribal Arts Show in San Francisco
2015: Exhibition: Jonathan Mwe di Malila, "Congo-Pop! the Lovechild between Pop-Art and Fauvism"

Since 1973 constantly varying exhibition of national and international textile-artists.

Publications 
 Batik – Europäische Künstler in Südost-Asien, 1977
 Batikhandbuch 136 Batikkünstler stellen sich vor, 1980
 Seidenmalerei Handbuch, 1983
 Internationale Batik Ausstellung Katalog, 1984, Köln
 Malerei auf Seide – Handbuch II, 1985 
 Seide, Farbe, Seidenmalerei – Handbuch III, 1987
 Seidenmalerei in Vollendung (Hrsg.) 1988
 Seidenmalerei Handbuch IV 1989
 VI. Biennale der Textilkunst 1990-1991 
 Seidenmalerei Handbuch V 1993
 25 Jahre Textile Kunst – Galerie Smend 1973 – 1998,Handbuch VI 
 Batiken von Fürstenhöfen und Sultanspalästen aus Java 2000,  Sammlung Rudolf G. Smend, Texte deutsch/englisch 
 Peter Wenger Batik – Retrospektive 2006, Katalog zur Ausstellung vom 27.10.05 - 7.1.06
 BATIK 75 selected masterpieces The Rudolf G. Smend Collection 2006, 85 Farbtafeln, Deutsch/Englisch 
 Out of Ireland – 50 Years of Batik by Peter Wenger, 2007, Gallery 1, Thomastown, Irland

References

External links 

Art museums and galleries in Germany
1973 establishments in West Germany
Art galleries established in 1973
Cologne